Two Time Winners is the third studio album by American pop singer Andy Williams and was released in the spring of 1959 by Cadence Records. This, his third LP for the label, is composed of songs that had been successful on two previous occasions or in two different ways.

The first recording from the album that was released as a single, "Hawaiian Wedding Song", entered the  Billboard Hot 100 in the issue of the magazine dated December 29, 1958, and stayed on the chart for 20 weeks, peaking at number 11.  Four months later, in the April 20 issue, the song spent its 1 week on the Hot R&B Sides chart at number 27. "Twilight Time" was issued as a single 3 years later to coincide with the release of the 1962 Cadence compilation Million Seller Songs and entered the Hot 100 at the end of the year in the December 8 issue for a 3-week run that took the song to number 86.

The album was released on compact disc for the first time as one of two albums on one CD by Collectables Records on September 12, 2000, the other album being Williams's late 1956 Cadence release entitled Andy Williams Sings Steve Allen, which was also his first LP.  Collectables included this CD in a box set entitled Classic Album Collection, Vol. 1, which contains 17 of his studio albums and 3 compilations and was released on June 26, 2001.

Reception

William Ruhlmann of Allmusic noted that "Williams continued to prove himself an effective and versatile singer capable of bringing off such lightly rocking or exotic revivals."

Track listing

Side one
 "Sail Along, Silvery Moon" (Harry Tobias, Percy Wenrich) - 1:56
 "Twilight Time" (Artie Dunn; Al Nevins; Morton Nevins; Buck Ram) - 2:38
 "So Rare" (Jerry Herst, Jack Sharpe) - 2:01
 "Hawaiian Wedding Song" (Al Hoffman, Charles E. King, Dick Manning) - 2:29
 "Blueberry Hill" (Al Lewis, Vincent Rose, Larry Stock) - 2:01
 "Sweet Leilani" (Harry Owens) - 2:19

Side two
 "Love Letters in the Sand" (J. Fred Coots, Charles Kenny, Nick Kenny) - 2:32
 "It's All in the Game" (Charles Gates Dawes, Carl Sigman) - 2:55
 "Blue Hawaii" (Ralph Rainger, Leo Robin) - 2:02
 "Be Mine Tonight" (Maria Teresa Lara, Sunny Skylar) - 2:21
 "My Happiness" (Borney Bergantine, Betty Peterson Blasco) - 2:23
 "Near You" (Francis Craig, Kermit Goell) - 2:29

Grammy nomination

The single "Hawaiian Wedding Song" brought the first of six Grammy nominations that Williams received over the course of his career, this time in the category of Best Vocal Performance, Male. The winner was Perry Como for "Catch a Falling Star".

Personnel 
Andy Williams - vocalist
Archie Bleyer - orchestra conductor
 Carlyle Hall - arranger

References

Bibliography

1959 albums
Andy Williams albums
Cadence Records albums
Albums conducted by Archie Bleyer